Giuseppe Castelli (born September 14, 1919 in Milan) was an Italian professional football player.

1919 births
Year of death missing
Italian footballers
Serie A players
A.C. Legnano players
Inter Milan players
U.C. Sampdoria players
U.S. Cremonese players
Aurora Pro Patria 1919 players
S.S.D. Varese Calcio players
Association football midfielders